Pi Alpha Alpha ( or PAA) is the national honor society for students of public administration. It is administered by the National Association of Schools of Public Affairs and Administration in the United States.

The organization was formed to promote excellence in the study and practice of public administration and public affairs. There are 167 Pi Alpha Alpha chapters, with more than 30,000 members.

Purpose
"The purpose of Pi Alpha Alpha is to encourage and recognize outstanding scholarship and accomplishment in public affairs and administration. Its objectives, such as fostering integrity, professionalism, and effective performance, promote the advancement of quality in the education and practice of the art and science of public affairs and administration. PAA membership identifies those with the highest performance levels in educational programs preparing them for public service careers."

History
Pi Alpha Alpha  was established in 1974 by NASPAA under the leadership of the first PAA president Don L. Bowen. This honor society began with the goal to encourage excellence and recognize students who have gone above and beyond in the study of public policy and administration.

Membership

Types
There are three different membership types: student, faculty/staff, and honorary.

Students are required to have 50% of NASPAA degree program coursework completed and a GPA of 3.7.

Memberships dues are set at $50 by PAA, and local chapters may collect additional dues for programming costs. Membership is for life.

Oath
"I pledge my support for the intellectual and professional advancement of the art and science of public administration and public affairs. I shall honor and respect the virtues and values of public service and those who serve.

"I shall uphold the eternal need for education that imbues public administrators with traditions of democratic governance.

"Moreover, as a member of Pi Alpha Alpha, I shall uphold the highest ethical standards applying to public service and will endeavor to encourage and engage in meaningful interaction with other members."

NASPAA
Pi Alpha Alpha is a program within NASPAA, the global standard in public service education. NASPAA owns the registered trademark for PAA (U.S. Reg. No. 4,708,021). PAA is a sponsor of the annual NASPAA Student Simulation Competition.

See also
 Master of Public Administration
 Doctor of Public Administration
 Master of Public Affairs
 Master of Public Policy
 Public administration theory
 Public policy
 Public policy schools

References

External links

 National Association of Schools of Public Affairs & Administration - about Pi Alpha Alpha

Public administration
Honor societies
Educational organizations based in the United States
Student organizations established in 1974
Former members of Association of College Honor Societies